Ilaiyangudi (or "Ilayangudi") is a town in Sivaganga district, Tamil Nadu state, India. It is the center of government for the surrounding tehsils. The town has a predominant Muslim population. Islam was introduced to Ilayangudi during the 15th and 16th centuries by Arab traders. The Tamil Muslim community was traditionally engaged in Business. Bazaar(Kadai Theru) is the central business district.

Location
The town is located near the junction of the state roads 29 and 34, linking Paramakudi to the south and Manamadurai, Sivagangai and Kalayarkovil to the north.

History
Ilaiyangudi is first recorded in the 3rd century BCE. In the 1st century BCE, followers of the Jain faith reached Tamil Nadu. Iconography of Mahavira (the ascetic Jain monk) from this time is found in Ilaiyangudi. for instance, a Mahavira statue is found outside the main Hindu temple. In general, Buddhist iconography is not found in Ilaiyangudi. However, the town's public water tank is called the therar oorani. The similar word thearar is a Tami term for a Buddhist monk.

The Rajendra Chola Eswara Temple, the main Hindu temple in Ilaiyangudi, was built by King Rajendra Chola I (1012 CE  1044 CE). It may have been a Jain temple converted to a Shivan temple by the king. The Manju Puthur Chettiyars, the Chettiyars of Ilayangudi were a Jain clan who converted to Shaivism. In Ilaiyangudi, there is an edict engraved on stone which dates to the 11th century.

The 63 nayanmars were Hindu saints of Tamil Nadu who were devoted to Shiva. The fourth was Ilayankudi Maranar. He lived in the 12th century CE and as his name suggests, he was born in Ilayangudi.

A Muslim population may have existed in the town in the 7th and 8th centuries CE. They were people who converted from Jainism to Islam. During the rule of the Kalabhra dynasty these people were textile weavers.

However, in the 15th century CE, a larger population of Muslims migrated to Ilaiyangudi from nearby areas. Approximately forty families left more southern regions due to drought and moved north and settled on the outskirts of Ilaiyangudi at Thuraiyan Pacheery where potable water was available. (The area is now located near the main bazaar on Kadai Road.)The Ilaiyangudi Muslims are mostly Rowthers (traditionally Landowners and cavalry people).

Geography

Hydrology
Ilaiyangudi lies in the southern part of the Kaveri (Cauvery) river delta. It is in a drought prone area. However, in the district there are two aquifers, the Gondwana and the Cuddalore aquifers. A water reservoir (samuthram) northwest of the town is filled from the Valasaikattu Kanmai, a branch from the Vagai River. The monsoon rain also helps fill the reservoir. The ancient Thevoorani is a small lake in the centre of the town.

Geology
The types of rock about Ilaiyangudi are approximately 60 percent sedimentary rock and 40 percent igneous rock. There is sandstone, laterite, charnockite, gneiss and granite covered by thick alluvium.

Climate
Ilaiyangudi has average minimum temperatures around 27 degrees Celsius and average maximum temperatures around 35 degrees Celsius.

Demographics
At the 2011 Census of India, the population of Ilaiyangudi was 24,767. 12,319 people were female. Males numbered 12,448. There are 990 females for every 1,000 males. Children under six years of age make up 10.73 percent of the population. The literacy rate in the town is 88.94 percent which exceeds the state average of 80.9 percent. 84.33 percent of women are literate. Male literacy is 93.03 percent.

Religion
The 2011 census of India found in Ilaiyangudi, 70 percent of residents are Tamil Muslims, 27 percent are Hindu,  and 3 percent are Christians, both Catholic and Protestant.

The town has four main Muslim groups (jamath) based on their members' occupation. The Ilaiyangudi Nesavu Pattadai (INP) was founded in the mid 16th century, representing textile weavers. The Mela Pattadai represented bullock cart drivers. The Kodikka Pattadai (Salai Hanafi Jamath) represented betel leaf growers and the Salaiyur Nesavu Pattadai (Salai Shaafi Jamath) represented textile weavers.

A first mosque in Ilaiyangudi was built in approximately 1450 CE. It was called the Keela Pallivasal. Further construction was made on the west side of the mosque in 1744, the Mela Pallivasal are all Hanafi Mosque. While one Shafi mosque was built in 1775 CE. The INP mosque was built in 1816 CE. The land had been given to the INP Jamath by the Vijayanagara king, Sadasiva Raya in 1553 and had been associated with prayer giving from that time.

Administration

There are 51 villages around Ilayangudi which falls under Ilayangudi town panchayat

Governance
The local governance of Ilaiyangudi is conducted under the Panchayati system. The town is divided into 18 wards. Elections for representatives of the wards are held every five years. The Ilaiyangudi panchayat provides water and sewerage amenities to nearly 6,000 residences and builds roads within the town limits. The services are funded by taxes paid to the panchayat.

Ilaiyyangudi is a center of governance (tehsil) for the town itself, an area of 16.4 km2, and for many surrounding villages.

The Ilaiyangudi assembly constituency is part of the Sivaganga Lok Sabha.

In 1965, under a Delimitation of Parliamentary and Assembly Constituencies Order, during the election of the 4th Lok Sabha, Ilaiyangudi became the 197th constituency of the Tamil Nadu state legislative assembly.

In 2008, under a Delimitation of Parliamentary and Assembly Constituency Order, the Ilaiyangudi assembly constituency was merged with Manamadurai.

Government Services

Cuisine 
Ilayangudi is very famous for Parotta, a Subcontinental layered flatbread made from Maida or Atta.  Apart from Parotta, the town also has Biriyani, Fastfood centers and shawarma, Idly shops, bakeries, Tea shops.

Literature
People from Ilaiyangudi have contributed to Tamil literature. However, few works of Ilaiyangudi authors have been preserved as printed works.

Katchi Pillaiyammal was the first published poet of Ilaiyangudi. Her father was Lukman Rawther, a philosopher. Pillaiyammal's main theme was wisdom.
 
Seeniaabil Rawther wrote Singara Vazhi Lavani about Ilaiyangudi. It was published in 1918 by Sivagangai Sri Kala Press.

Mathura Kavi
Thenmalaikhan Mathura Kavi Batcha Pulavar (1860 CE  1930 CE) lived in Ilaiyangudi and was honoured with a parcel of land (a pattayam) by the Zamindar of Sivaganga. He was a descendant of the Noordeen family. A building in Ilaiyangudi, built by Mathura Kavi's grandson, and a street in Ilaiyangudi are named after Mathura Kavi.

In 1892 CE, Mathura Kavi wrote a collection of poems in praise of Nagoor Meeran Shahib. The first edition was published by Mohamed Samadani Press (Ibrahim Rawther) in Karaikal. The second edition was published in 1963 CE by Quraniya Press (Abdul Jabbar) in Madurai. Also in 1892 CE, the Madurai Pandiyan Press published his Pillai Thzamil Collection. In them, he narrates the childhood events of Nagore Shahul Hamid (1490  CE  1579 CE), an Islamic mystic saint and preacher in Tamil Nadu. A second edition was published in 1963 CE by Quraniya Press, Madurai. The collection includes four short poems, Kalithurai, Nagai Patthu, Nagai Kochagam and Nagai Thiruvasagam.

His other works include Arul Mani Malai, poems venerating Karaikal Kadir Mohideen. Karaikal had published Mathur Kavi's Hazarat Shahu Ali Masthan Oli Shahib poems at the Mohamed Samadani Press. A second edition was published by Quraniya Press in 1963. His Thirukarana Vannangal poems, and the Deen Vilakka Vannam poems dedicated to Hazarat Syed Ibrahim Sahid of Ervadi, were published by the Karaikal Mohamed Samadani Press in 1895 CE and a second edition published by Quraniaya Press in Madurai, also in 1963. His book, Pancha Rathina Vannangal was not published but remnants of handwritten copies were found in his house and published by 1963 by Quraniya Press. In 1922, Kuthubu Mani Malai, dedicated by Mathura Kavi to Mohideen Abdul Kadir Jailani was published by Thubash T. K. Mohamed Ibrahim of Abiramam-Natham, a relative of Mathura Kavi and a representative of the Manonmani Vilasam Press in Madurai.

Educational institutions

 Dr. Zakir Hussain College (1970). 
 Ilayangudi Higher Secondary School (1914). 
 St. Anne's Matric Higher Secondary School, Mallipattinam, Ilayangudi.
 Rahmanniya Elementary School (1914),Ilayangudi. 
 Government Girls' High School, Ilayangudi.
 Melapallivasal Girls' Higher Secondary School, Ilayangudi
 INP Matriculation School, Ilayangudi.
 Iqra Matriculation School, Ilayangudi.
 Hamidiyya Higher Secondary School, Salaiyur, Ilayangudi.
 IILM(Ilayangudi Institute of Learning and Monitoring) Elementary School.
 Haji K. K. Ibrahim Ali Higher Secondary School, Pudur, Ilayangudi.
 Muslim Nalvali Abiviruthi School, .
 Al Ameen Buhari Technical Institute,ilayangudi.
 Arabic Madarasa, Pudur Road, Ilayangudi.

Notable people
 Ilayankudi Maranar, is a Nayanar saint, venerated in the Hindu sect of Shaivism. He is generally counted as the fourth in the list of 63 Nayanars.
 Allama Karim Gani, academic and independence activist. He was an associate of Subhas Chandra Bose.

References

External links
 Satellite view
 Community website
 Community website

Cities and towns in Sivaganga district